Barford St. John is a small village on the north bank of the River Swere in Oxfordshire, England, about  south of Banbury. It is part of the civil parish of Barford St. John and St. Michael. In the Middle Ages it was sometimes called Little Barford or North Barford to distinguish it from the larger village of Barford St. Michael on the opposite bank of the Swere.

Chapel
The Church of England chapel of St. John was built in about 1150, but only the south doorway and the font survive from this period. The chancel was rebuilt in the 13th century, and the Decorated Gothic windows in the nave were added in the 14th century. There was a tower at the southwest corner of the church, with the date 1622 on a stone near the top. In 1860–61 the Gothic Revival architect G.E. Street rebuilt the church, demolishing the tower and replacing it with a new one over the south porch.  St. John's was built as a dependent chapelry of the parish church of Barford St. Michael, and it remains part of the same ecclesiastical parish. The parish of St. John and St. Michael and that of Deddington and Hempton are now run as a single benefice.

RAF station
RAF Barford St John was established just north of the village in 1941. It ceased flying operations in 1946 but the United States Air Force has used it as a radiocommunications centre since 1951.

References

Sources

External links
 
 

Villages in Oxfordshire